= Marist University of the Congo =

- Université mariste du Congo
- Motto: Vera scientia Lux mundi sit
- Type: Private university
- Established: 2012
- Rector: Billy Bolakonga
- Students: 1,500
- Location: Kisangani, Democratic Republic of the Congo; 0.518863°N 25.201116°E
- Campus: Urban
- Language: French, Lingala
- Website: www.fmsumc.org

The Marist University of the Congo (UMC) is a private university in the Democratic Republic of the Congo, located in Kisangani, Tshopo Province.

== History ==
The Congregation of Marist Brothers arrived in the Democratic Republic of the Congo on 7 September 1911, to oversee official primary schools for boys. They were granted by the colonial authorities of the Belgian Congo to settle in the Orientale Province. It was in Stanleyville, now Kisangani, where the Marist Brothers opened their first school in Belgian Congo.

In August 2011, the Ministry of Higher Education and University issued an authorization decree allowing the Marist Brothers of the Central-East Africa Province to establish a private university in Kisangani, Orientale Province, DRC, under the name "Université Mariste du Congo (UMC)".

== Location ==
Marist University of the Congo is situated in the Artisanal quarter in the Makiso commune, bordered to the north by Mwangaza Primary School, to the south by the teachers' camp of Mwangaza, to the east by the General Reference Hospital of Kabondo, and to the west by the Sainte Marie School Group.
